E for Explosion are an American alternative rock/shoegazing band formed by former JamisonParker singer Jamison Covington after the group's breakup in 2005. The only two constant members of the band were Covington (vocals, guitar) and his wife, Dai Britain Covington (keyboards). After undergoing a hiatus in 2013, the band self-released two EPs in 2020.

History
The band formed upon the breakup of JamisonParker and was originally called Dance With The Dead, this was strictly a solo project of Covington.  Covington would later change the name of the project to "Covington," and release a number of demos under that moniker.  He then recruited touring musicians and began playing under the name "E For Explosion," a name chosen because of Covington's admiration of science fiction writer Ray Bradbury.  After the band released an EP, they were signed to Eyeball Records and released their debut album Reinventing the Heartbeat on May 20, 2008. The album was produced by Dave Trumfio.

The group released a new demo titled "Blankets and Blonde Hair" on February 23, 2009.  A second demo was released on March 9, 2009, titled "This is Goodbye."  Both have been removed from the group's Myspace player.

On September 29, 2009, Covington announced through Myspace that E For Explosion would be releasing a 5-song acoustic EP "soon", consisting of "all new unheard, unperformed and unreleased songs". The EP would be titled Why Do I Keep Hitting Myself With a Hammer? 'Cause It Feels So Good When I Stop... It was later announced that the EP was to be released sometime in March 2010. The track listing was as follows:

 I'm Disappearing
 This Is Me Being Honest
 Yeah Yeah, So I Dreamt of You Again
 Maybe
 Sometimes Sleep Ain't Enough

Why Do I Keep Hitting Myself With a Hammer? 'Cause It Feels So Good When I Stop... was later abandoned by the band without explanation and all Myspace posts regarding it were removed.  The EP would later be released on Amazon MP3 and iTunes, for purchase in late 2011.

On December 2, 2009, the group released a Christmas song titled "A Long Lonely Christmas."  Covington stated in a Myspace blog that the track "won't be on the upcoming EP", and that more info regarding the EP would be shared very soon. On February 16, 2010, the band posted another demo called "Cool Kids", and noted that it was planned to be re-recorded for their next full-length album.

On October 29, 2010, it was announced via E for Explosion's MySpace page that a four-song EP entitled Hold Grudges Not Hands was scheduled to be released digitally on November 23, 2010. The track-listing is as follows:

 Cool Kids
 PS I'm Dead
 Blankets and Blonde Hair
 This is Goodbye

After some "technical difficulties", as announced via Covington's Twitter account, the EP was finally made available for purchase via iTunes on November 25, 2010. The band blogged on their Myspace announcing its release, as well as thanking the fans for being patient.

On July 5, 2011, E For Explosion released a new song titled "Answers" on their Myspace and Facebook pages.  The song was a b-side taken from their upcoming EP, Love, which was released on August 2. According to E For Explosion's Facebook post, the EP will be the first of three EPs, named respectively Love, Out, Loud, to be released by the end of the year.

E for Explosion later released a "re-envisioning" of several songs from their debut full-length album titled Echoes of Reinvention.  The EP was released on February 14, 2012.

The band self-released their second album, The View from Cypress Lane in October 2012. The two final EPs in the Love, Out, Loud trilogy were released in 2013 and the band went on hiatus at the end of the year.

The band reconvened and self-released two EPs in 2020.

Discography

Albums
 Reinventing the Heartbeat (Eyeball Records, May 20, 2008)
 The View from Cypress Lane (self-released, October 16, 2012)

EPs
 Paper Flowers (self-released, October 2007)
 Hold Grudges Not Hands (self-released, November 2010)
 Love (self-released August 2011, re-issued March 2013)
 Why Do I Keep Hitting Myself With a Hammer? 'Cause It Feels So Good When I Stop... (self-released, September 2011)
 Echoes of Reinvention (self-released, February 2012)
 Out (self-released, May 2013)
 Loud (self-released, 2013)
 Remember Blue Skies (self-released, 2020)
 Sundowner (self-released, 2020)

Singles
 "I Explode" (2008)
 "Answers" (2011)

References

External links
 E For Explosion's profile on Myspace

Alternative rock groups from Kentucky
Indie rock musical groups from Kentucky
Musical groups established in 2005
Musical groups disestablished in 2013
American shoegaze musical groups
2005 establishments in Kentucky